Timberforce was the name given to units of No. 12 Commando and No. 14 (Arctic) Commando formed at various times between 1943 and 1944 for raids and reconnaissance of the Norwegian coastline.

References
Notes

Bibliography
 Mike Chappell, Army Commandos 1940-45, Osprey Publishing, 1996 

Military units and formations established in 1943
Military units and formations disestablished in 1943
Military units and formations established in 1944
Military units and formations disestablished in 1944
Commandos (United Kingdom)